Syed Aqeel-ul-Gharavi also known as  Ayatullah Aqeel-ul-Gharavi  (born 2 February 1964) is a leading Indian Twelver Shia scholar, philosopher, thinker, writer, poet, educationist, community activist, critic and a mujtahid. Presently, Aqeel-ul-Gharavi is acknowledged as one of the famous and senior Shia scholars from the Indian Subcontinent. He was the principal of Hawza-e-Ilmia Jamia-tus-Saqalain, Delhi and is the current chairman of Safinatul Hidaya Trust, India. He is the vice-President of All India Muslim Majlis-e-Mushawarat and member of All India Muslim Personal Law Board.  Syed Aqeel is also a member of the Majma Jahani Ahlulbayt, Iran. Gharavi supervises PhD students at the Aligarh University, India. In addition to all of these, he also serves as patron of Imamia Islamic University, Delhi and secretary of Forum of Philosophers, India.

Allama Aqeel ul Gharavi is currently appointed representative of Majma Taghrib by Ayatullah Sheikh Mohsen Araki for the Indian sub-continent. He is also the representative of Grand Ayatollah Basheer al-Najafi in London, UK.

Aqeel-ul-Gharavi is the supervisor of monthly published magazine Adabi Kainat. Adabi Kainat was founded in 1971, and has been providing quality Urdu content to the public ever since. It is originally located in Banaras now.

Biography

Early life and education
Syed Aqeel Gharavi was born in Banaras, India, in 1964 but his whole family migrated to Najaf when he was very young. In Najaf, he got his primary education and after some years he went to India where he completed his secondary education from a college in Banaras. Later, he graduated from Jamia Millia Islamia University in Delhi. After completing his graduation, he decided to study religion in Qom despite of his interest in medical sciences. In Qom he studied under many teachers. Moreover, he also went to the seminary of Mashhad, where he studied for several years.

Ijtihad
In 1994, he got ijazah (permission) for ijtihad from Grand Ayatollah Naser Makarem Shirazi and from then, he became a mujtahid.

Teachers
Some of his teachers are:
 Fazel Lankarani
 Hossein Mazaheri
 Naser Makarem Shirazi
 Syed Izzudin Husseini Zanajni
 Syed Ali Naqi Naqvi Naqqan
 Hassan Hassanzadeh Amoli
 Taqi falsafi
 Mohsin Araki
 Syed Muhammad Jawad Tehrani
 Ali Movahed Abtahi
 Syed Muhammad Hussaini Tehrani

Return to India
After that he came back to India. During his stay in India, he became principal of Hawza e Ilmiya Jamia tus Saqlain, Delhi. From more than three decades, he has been addressing lectures and majalis in different countries. Through his speeches, he has revived the old Lucknowi style of reciting majalis of different scholars such as Syed Ali Naqi Naqvi. Famous Urdu poet Baqir Zaidi, in one of his Marsiya pays tribute to Ayatollah Aqeel ul Gharavi by mentioning his  unique style of reciting majalis and his superiority over other orators like this:

(باقرؔ زیدی)

Residence
Aqeel ul Gharavi currently resides in London and addresses Majalis-e-Aza at Babul Murad Centre and Masjid-e-Ali (AS).

Majalis and seminars

Lectures and Seminars

Syed Aqeel-ul-Gharavi has addressed hundreds of seminars in Pakistan, India and other countries on different topics. Some of the seminars are listed below:
 Unified Syllabus, Varanasi, India - Dec 1983 - Presided by the VC Dr. Iqbal Narain. International Seminar on the same theme in Delhi - 1988.
 A three-day International seminar on Imam Khomeini.
 Seminar on Educational Theory of Abul Kalaam Azad - April 1988.
 International seminar on Nahjul Balagha. Ayatullah Hashemi Rafsanjani also attended this seminar - 1989.
 International Seminar on Mulla Sadra at Jamia Millia Islamia in collaboration with the Ministry of Irshaad (Moral Guidance) - Delhi - 1992
 Symposium on Imam Ali (as) presided by Dr. S.D Sharma, former president of India.
 Presidential address at Fatimyah college - 2007
 Lecture at Fatimyah College - March 2008
 Seminar on the topic of Knowledge and ways of its acquisition - Karachi - 2010
 Seminar on Critical study of spiritual poetry - Karachi - 2010
 Relationship between knowledge and values - Seminar - Karachi - 2011
 Seminar on Basic values of Spiritual Civilization - Held by Arts council of Pakistan, Karachi - 2012
 Disocrd among Ummah - conspiracies and remedies - 2013
 Seminar on ideology of Governance in Islam - Karachi - 2014
 Quranic Sciences - Brief history and basic concepts - Presided by Khawaja Ithna Ashari jamat, Karachi - 2015

 Lecture at JSO Organization Lahore Division - Lahore - 2015

  Effects of Karbala on Urdu Literature - Seminar - Held by Urdu Markaz International - 2016
 Presidential address at the 25th Hussain Day - Banglore, India - 2017
 International Seminar on Late prof. Nayyar Masood - Lucknow - 2017 - Conducted by Dr. Abbas Raza Nayyarِ
 14 lectures based on Ilm-e-Akhlaq - London - 2018
 Lecture at Shrine of Imam Hussain - Karbala - Held by Sheikh Mehdi Karbalai - 2019
 International conference on Imam Ali (a.s) - New Delhi - 2019 - Organised by Safinatul Hidaya Trsut

Majalis in Pakistan and foreign countries
Syed Aqeel-ul-Gharavi has addressed thousands of majalis in different parts of the world. Following is a list containing some of his majalis addressed in Pakistan and other countries:
 From 1999 to 2015, Syed Aqeel-ul-Gharavi has addressed to majalis in Pakistan. It included different cities like Lahore, Hyderabad, Multan, Karachi, Rawalpindi and Islamabad etc.
 In Karachi, he addressed 10 majalis in 1999 at Imambarghah Shah-e-Shaheedan (Residence of Late Syed Ali Muttaqi Jafri) on the topic of "Asma-ul-Husna". Since then whenever he come to Pakistan, he addresses Muharram majalis in this Imambargah. He has also addressed majalis in other places like Imambargah Babulilm, Imambargah Madinatul ilm Imambargah Shah e Najaf etc. in Karachi.
 In Lahore, he addressed five majalis in 2003 at 6-B, Model Town. Since then, he has been coming to Lahore and addressing at various venues from 2003-2015 specially at 6-B, Model Town, "Imam Bargah Gulistan-e-Zahra (sa)" at Abbot Road, Aza Khana e Zahra (30-K, Model Town), Jamia Masjid Sahib uz Zaman etc. on different topics like theology, philosophy, science & Islam.
 In 2007, Allama Syed Aqeel-ul-Gharavi extended his visit to Multan. He addressed two majalis at "Imambargah Haideria", Gulghast Colony and one at Mumtazabad. Allama Aqeel-ul-Gharavi has also addressed majalis in Kuwait.
 In 2009, Syed Aqeel-ul-Gharavi addressed majalis in Sargodha, Punjab, Pakistan at Dar ul uloom Muhammadia ( دارالعلوم محمدیہ ) on 1 and 2 February 2009 on the topic Ramz-e-Quran.
 In 2009, he went to Rawalpindi and addressed five days majalis on the topic of "Imam e Zamana  (as)".

 In 2010, Aqeel-ul-Gharavi addressed majalis in Hyderabad, Sindh at Ali palace, Qasimabad.
 From 2011 to 2015, he addressed majalis in the same cities (that are mentioned above) at different venues with different topics. The most important topics that he addressed there were Khatam e Nubuwwat (2011), Maghfirat (2011), Surah e Dahar (2012), Quran aur Wahdat (2013), Surah e Fajr (2014) and Hayat baad az Maut (2015) etc.
 In March-2014 Ayatullah Aqeel-ul-Gharavi visited City of Edmonton, Alberta Canada on the invitation of HCECA of Edmonton to address three Majalis in connection of Ayam E Fatmiah at Hussaini Centre.
 In 2016 and 2017, Syed Aqeel ul Gharavi visited India and addressed majalis and seminars in the cities like Lucknow, Delhi and Hyderabad.  He also addressed majlis of Arbaeen in Karbala in 2017.

 In 2018, he went to India, Australia and Canada to address majalis in these countries.
 In 2019, Syed Aqeel-ul-Gharavi visited Muscat, Oman and addressed five majalis of Ayyam e Fatimiah on martyrdom of Fatimah. He also addressed three majalis of Ayyam e Fatimyah in Qom, Iran.  Moreover,  he also went to Sydney, Australia to address lectures and majalis there in the month of Ramadan.
 On the invitation of organisers of Masjid e Iranian in Mumbai, Syed Aqeel-ul-Gharavi went to Mumbai in order to address 10 Majalis of first Ashra (from 1st to 10th Muharram / 31 August to 9 September) in Masjid Iranian also known as Mughal Masjid. Thousands of people from all over Mumbai attended these majalis. ِ
 He addressed a majlis at HMJI Imambargah in Pune on 12 September 2019 (12th Moharram H.1441).
His London Muharram Majalis's are featured on several channels such as Ahlebait TV (live), SUCH TV and 24 News HD.
Khamsa-e-Majalis addressed by him in sayyed bada, Junnar (Dist:Pune) form 1st safar H.1444 (August 2022).

Works
More than 22 of his works in Urdu language have been published which are in different fields like philosophy, theology, literature, supplications etc. Some of these works are based on his speeches delivered at Imambargah Shah e Shaheedan, Karachi. He has also written several books in English, Arabic and Persian languages. His first literary magazine Adabi Kainaat was published in 1980, when his age was about 16 years. Some of his published works are:

Urdu and English

 Adabi Kainat (literary magazine - founded in 1981)
 Naya Taleemi Tajreba (1985) 
 Angbeen (1987) (Granted award by the Delhi Urdu Academy).
 Tajalliyat (2005)
 Ilm-o-Irada (March 2005) 
 Chiragh-e-Rah (September 2004) - 
 Aiyna-e-Qaza-o-Qadr (January 2008) 
 Husn-e-Ikhtiyaar
 Maqaam-e-Khatme Nubuwat aur Insaan 
 Wilayat-e-Haq aur Imam Hussain (as) 
 Falsafa-e-Meraj
 Thematic study of the Holy Quran -  (2002) (book in English language)
 Eid-e-Hashr aur Jashn-e-Mahshar - Based on 10 lectures at Mehfil-e-Shahe Shaheedan, Karachi (2000)
 Salaam-e-Shauq - Literary and spiritual exegesis of Ziarat-e-Waritha - (1994)
 Dua
 Wliayat e Uzma
 Majalis e Gharavi (2009) 
 Tauheed aur Imam Hussain 
 Jahan-e-Taleem (A book based on the history of Hawza e Ilmiya Najaf)

Arabic
 Fiqh us-Salat Ala Al-Nabi (saw) (fi-al-fiqh, Jurisprudence)
 Al-Hadees Bayn al Isnaad wal Fiqah (fi Ilm Al-Diray'a, Hadith and Ilm Al-Rijal)
 Behas-e-Tafseeri o Fiqhi
 Al-Bab us-Saani al-Ashar (fi Ilm-il-Kalam)
 Al Haqaiq ul  Emaniya (fi Ilm-il-Kalam)

See also
 Ayatollah
 List of Ayatollahs
 Syed
 Syed Ali Raza Rizvi
 Syed Shehanshah Hussain Naqvi

References

External links

Collection of books by Ayatollah Aqeel ul Gharavi
Ayatollah Aqeel ul Gharavi's biggest majalis collection.
Ayatollah Aqeel ul Gharavi's official website.
Ayatollah Aqeel ul Gharavi as Supervisor of Safina tul Hidayah Trust Delhi, India.
Audio Majalis Of Allama Aqeel ul Gharavi
Ayatollah Aqeel Gharavi's Majalis collection on Youtube

1964 births
Living people
Indian Shia Muslims
21st-century Muslim scholars of Islam
Islamic philosophers
20th-century Indian philosophers
Indian ayatollahs
Indian poets
Indian columnists
Indian educators
Indian literary critics
Muslim writers
Muslim poets